The 2021 Diriyah ePrix (officially the 2021 ABB FIA Formula E Diriyah ePrix) was a pair of Formula E electric car races held at the Riyadh Street Circuit in the town of Diriyah, north-west of Riyadh, in Saudi Arabia on 26 and 27 February 2021. It was the opening round of the 2020–21 Formula E season and the third edition of the Diriyah ePrix, and marked the first ever Formula E race held at night. The first race was won by Nyck de Vries, with Edoardo Mortara and Mitch Evans rounding out the podium. Sam Bird won the second race, ahead of Robin Frijns and António Félix da Costa.

Classification

Race one

Qualifying

Notes:
  – Nick Cassidy, Tom Blomqvist, and Nico Müller had their fastest qualifying lap times deleted for failing to reduce speed under double yellow flag.

Race

Notes:
  – Pole position; fastest in group stage.
  – Fastest lap.

Standings after the race

Drivers' Championship standings

Teams' Championship standings

 Notes: Only the top five positions are included for both sets of standings.

Race two

Qualifying

Notes:
  – Alex Lynn received a 3-place grid penalty for causing a collision in race one.
  – Following a brake failure in Edoardo Mortara's car that caused him to crash heavily into the barriers in free practice, all four Mercedes-powered cars were deemed unsafe and therefore not allowed to participate in qualifying.

Race

Notes:
  – Pole position; fastest in group stage.
  – Fastest lap.
  – Jean-Éric Vergne, René Rast and Tom Blomqvist received a drive-through penalty apiece for failing to activate the second of the two mandatory attack modes. Rast and Blomqvist also received a further drive-through penalty for speeding under full course yellow, as did Nick Cassidy. Alexander Sims and Alex Lynn received a drive-through penalty each for a technical infringement involving the throttle pedal map. All these penalties were issued after the race and were therefore converted into 24-second time penalties.

Standings after the race

Drivers' Championship standings

Teams' Championship standings

 Notes: Only the top five positions are included for both sets of standings.

Events

Major incidents
Edoardo Mortara suffered a brake failure in his Venturi-Mercedes car while making practice starts after the end of Saturday's free practice 3, causing him to crash heavily into the barriers at turn one. He was taken to hospital for precautionary checks. Mortara was permitted to race, despite not taking part in qualifying. However, he did not take the start as his mechanics could not repair the damage to his car in time.

Later on in the day, race two ended early following an accident – not shown on the international broadcast, but on one of the track's CCTV cameras – involving Mitch Evans and Alex Lynn in which the latter's car flipped over. It came shortly after Sébastien Buemi had come to a halt and Maximilian Günther and Tom Blomqvist had made contact further up ahead on the same lap. Immediately after Lynn's car stopped, Evans jumped out of his car to check on the Briton. The safety car was called out, and eventually the race was concluded with a red flag. Lynn was taken to hospital for examination, and later the Mahindra team announced on Twitter that he had been cleared from the hospital, and would thus be allowed to take part in the Rome ePrix. The way the crash unfolded looked similar to that of Formula One driver Mark Webber at the 2010 European Grand Prix, with the exception that Lynn's car landed upside down rather than Webber's right side up.

Other
During the award ceremony, the government of Saudi Arabia, with a Patriot missile, neutralized a missile over Riyadh, near the town of Diriyah, allegedly fired by Yemen's Houthi rebels. There were no injuries, but flights were diverted or cancelled, making some participants go back to their hotels, and a house was damaged. This also raised concerns about the then-upcoming Saudi Arabian Grand Prix, with regards to safety for the staff, teams, and drivers; such a missile attack did occur during the 2022 running of the Formula One event.

Notes

References

|- style="text-align:center"
|width="35%"|Previous race:2020 Berlin ePrix
|width="30%"|FIA Formula E World Championship2020–21 season
|width="35%"|Next race:2021 Rome ePrix
|- style="text-align:center"
|width="35%"|Previous race:2019 Ad Diriyah ePrix
|width="30%"|Diriyah ePrix
|width="35%"|Next race:2022 Diriyah ePrix
|- style="text-align:center"

2021
2020–21 Formula E season
2021 in Saudi Arabian sport
February 2021 sports events in Asia
2021